Friulano is the name of a firm cow's milk cheese made in Canada named after the Friuli region of Italy. It is rindless and interior-ripened with a yellow surface and interior. It is salty and tastes slightly of hazelnut. It is sometimes called Italian Cheddar, though it is not cheddared and does not taste like a Cheddar.  It closely resembles Italian Montasio cheese which it strives to imitate, but has a different name since, in Canada, the name Montasio can only be used for cheeses made in the Montasio mountains of the Friuli region of Italy.

See also
 List of cheeses

References

External links
 

Canadian cheeses
Cow's-milk cheeses
Italian-Canadian culture